Ian R. MacDonald is a Professor of Biological Oceanography at Florida State University.  In his research, he uses imaging and GIS techniques to investigate the ecology of deep-sea hydrocarbon seeps, primarily in the Gulf of Mexico.  He was among the scientists to question the size of the Deepwater Horizon oil spill, the largest oil spill in U.S. history.  Dr. MacDonald used satellite imagery to challenge estimates of the size of the spill by BP and U.S. governmental scientists, and to produce independent scientific evidence of the spill's significance, which BP and the U.S. governmental scientists eventually confirmed.  He holds a Ph.D. in Oceanography from Texas A&M University.

References

External links
 Florida State University faculty profile
 GulfBase biography
 LSU, FSU experts answer questions about the oil spill, an interview from the Washington Post

External links

American oceanographers
Florida State University faculty
Texas A&M University alumni
Living people
Year of birth missing (living people)